Félix Díaz Ortega (June 11, 1931 – February 6, 2006) was a Venezuelan ex-military, medic and far-right politician, founder and leader of the nationalist New Order party. He died in his hometown on February 6, 2006.

Biography
Díaz Ortega joined the Military Academy at a very young age, there he dedicated his spare time at reading and sports like boxing and fencing. Among his favorite books: Mein Kampf by Adolf Hitler, The Art of War by Von Clausewitz, Thus Spoke Zarathustra by Nietzsche and Venezuela Heroica by Eduardo Blanco. Assigned to the Air Force, he participated in the bombing of Los Monjes Archipelago in the Caribbean Sea, Venezuela, helping at the recovering of sovereignty of these islands, for which he was decorated and promoted by the then President, General Marcos Pérez Jiménez.

Interested in yoga and hermeticism, he befriends the mystic Serge Raynaud de la Ferriere and receives a high initiation of this through the Universal Great Brotherhood.

On April 20, 1960 was involved in the military revolt led by his friend General José María Castro Leon. against what they believed to be the Marxist government of Romulo Betancourt, failing the coup attempt, Díaz Ortega is exiled to the United States, establishing in Louisiana, briefly engaging in publicist work and contacts with various nationalist factions, including the John Birch Society, the American Legion and the American Nazi Party.

He returned to Venezuela in 1963 and became an activist in the fascist-lining Social Nationalist Movement, who was part of the electoral coalition that supported the candidacy for president of the Republic of the writer Arturo Uslar Pietri.

Post-military life
Díaz Ortega joins the School of Medicine of the Universidad Central de Venezuela (UCV) where he creates a cell of the Social Nationalist Movement, which waged pitched battles against the hippies and communists who passed in the halls of the university ending at Park Caobos, that then it was a wooded area. Once licensed as a physician he joins the World Crusade Against Diabetes and as a volunteer starts traveling to countries like Yugoslavia, Cuba and Inner Mongolia in humanitarian, scientific and research work.

Political career
In January 1974 he founded the New Order Party (NOR) with which he made a major ideological outreach and recruitment across the whole country. Despite having few resources, he would come to be nominated as a candidate for President for the 1993 Venezuelan general election, wrote several articles in newspapers and magazines about border issues, deteriorating public health, personal insecurity, housing shortages and the political threat of communism.

He ran for the National Constituent Assembly of 1999, executed numerous philanthropic activities in the busy zone of Petare and California (Caracas) through his popular network of doctors and the non-government organization Organized Middle-Class (Clase Media Organizada, CLAMOR). NOR finally dissolve in 2002.

References

1931 births
2006 deaths
People from Caracas
Venezuelan politicians